Viva Erotica is a 1996 Hong Kong erotic comedy film co-written and directed by Derek Yee and Lo Chi-Leung. The film is developed as a sex-comedy film, though with a serious subject of how an artist has to compromise his artistic integrity to make a living.

Synopsis
The story centers on the unsuccessful film-director Kwok-Wing (Leslie Cheung) and his producer Chung (Law Kar-ying), who agrees to make Category III sex/porn movies for their financial stability. Their movie projects are financed by a gangster boss Pui (Paul Chun). Shu Qi and Karen Mok played the roles of the leading actresses in the movie. In the end, Wing finally decides not to compromise his artistic integrity by making a porn movie.

Cast
 Leslie Cheung as Kwok-Wing (Director)
 Karen Mok as Man-Wai (Wing's Girlfriend)
 Shu Qi as Mango, Actress
 Law Kar-ying as Chung (Producer)
 Paul Chun as Pui (Boss)
 Elvis Tsui as Wah
 Allen Ting as Chi-Chun
 Sean Lau as Wan Tung-sing
 Anthony Wong Chau-Sang as Wong Jing
 Peter Ngor as Kwan
 Teddy Chan as Sum
 Vincent Kok as Chiu

Reception
The film, despite being rated III in Hong Kong for its sexual content, was highly praised by critics and the public alike. The film was hailed for being well-directed and woven in great artistic details.

Awards and nominations
16th Hong Kong Film Awards

Won 
 Best Supporting Actress (Shu Qi)
 Best New Artist (Shu Qi)

Nominations 
 Best Picture
 Best Director (Derek Yee, Lo Chi-Leung)
 Best Actor (Leslie Cheung Kwok-Wing)
 Best Supporting Actor (Tsui Kam-Kong)
 Best Original Music Score (Clarence Hui Yuen, Chiu Jun-Fun, Lau Cho-Tak)
 Best Song ("Sik Ching Nam Nui", performed by Karen Mok and Jordan Chan)

47th Berlin International Film Festival
 Golden Bear (nominated)

References

External links
 
 Viva Erotica @ HKMDB

1996 films
1990s Cantonese-language films
Hong Kong sex comedy films
1990s sex comedy films
Films directed by Derek Yee
Films about pornography
Films directed by Law Chi-leung
1996 comedy films
1990s Hong Kong films